Bishwadeep Chatterjee is an Indian film sound designer, sound editor and audio mixer. He won the National Film Award for Best Audiography thrice for the films Madras Cafe in 2013, Bajirao Mastani in 2015, Uri: The Surgical Strike in 2018. He is also the Member of The Oscar Academy's Class of 2018

Filmography

Awards
 National Film Award for Best Audiography - Madras Cafe
 National Film Award for Best Audiography - Bajirao Mastani
 National Film Award for Best Audiography - Uri: The Surgical Strike
 National Film Award for Best Non-Feature Film Audiography - Children of the Soil

References 

Indian sound designers
Living people
Year of birth missing (living people)